The RCD Cup 1969 was the third edition of the RCD Cup professional football tournament, held in Ankara, Turkey in 1969. This was a three nation tournament played in league format between Iran, Pakistan and Turkey.

Venue

Results

Top scorers
3 Goals
 Can Bartu

2 Goals
 Ender Konca
 Gholam Hossein Mazloumi
 Hossein Kalani

Squads

Iran

Head coach:   Hossein Fekri

Pakistan

Turkey

Head coach:  Abdullah Gegić

References
RSSSF Page on RCD Cup tournament
TeamMelli.com page for squad list
NationalFootballTeams
Turkish Football Federation
TURKFUTBOLU

1969
1969
1969 in Asian football
1969–70 in Turkish football
Sports competitions in Ankara
1960s in Ankara